Valentīna Eiduka (born 12 March 1937) is a retired Latvian javelin thrower. Currently she is the coach of several notable Latvian javelin throwers, including Olympic medalists Vadims Vasiļevskis and Ainārs Kovals.

Her personal best throw is 52.97 metres, achieved in 1964. During her career she became an eight-time Latvian SSR champion in javelin throw. In 2006 and 2008 she was voted the Latvian Coach of the year. In 2008, she also received the fourth rank Order of the Three Stars.

She has been coaching Olympic medalists Vadims Vasiļevskis and Ainārs Kovals, as well as the current junior world record holder Zigismunds Sirmais, Sinta Ozoliņa-Kovala, Inga Kožarenoka. Formerly she also coached Voldemārs Lūsis, the son of legendary Jānis Lūsis.

References 

1937 births
Living people
Latvian female javelin throwers